Games Uplate Live was a late night game show that served as the final program of ABS-CBN on its broadcast schedule. It was co-produced with Endemol, and airs Monday to Friday after Bandila. The show was hosted by Jaymee Joaquin. It showcases various interactive games such as word games, anagrams, puzzles as well as math problems that contestants must solve in order to win. It also features live chat services. In order to register for the show, viewers must download the picture message, logo, MMS, or ringtone of the day by messaging the text code "UP" to 2366. The names of the texters that have registered are then placed in a bowl, out of which one name is drawn out of per night. The person whose name is pulled out will receive a call asking them to participate in the show.

Host
 Jaymee Joaquin

See also
 List of programs broadcast by ABS-CBN

References

External links
 Games UpLate Live on ABS-CBN

ABS-CBN original programming
Philippine game shows
Television series by Endemol
Phone-in quiz shows
2006 Philippine television series debuts
2009 Philippine television series endings
Filipino-language television shows